Arusi (also spelled Alusi or Arunsi) are spirits that are worshiped and served in the Igbo religion. There are many different Arusi and each has its own purpose and function.

Ancestors
The Igbo world is divided into several interconnected realms, principal among them being the realm of the living, the realm of the dead or of the ancestors, and the realm of the unborn. Individuals who led an honorable life and received a proper burial proceeded to the ancestral realm to take their place among the ancestors ("Ndichie"), who are separate from the Arusi. From there they kept a watchful eye on the clan and visited their loved ones among the living with blessings such as fertility, good health, longevity, and prosperity. In gratitude the living offered sacrifices to them at the family hearth, and sought their counsel.

Arusi worship
Each major Arusi has a priest in every town that honors it, and the priest is assisted by a group of acolytes and devotees.

Children and Arusi
Children are still considered the greatest blessing of all and this is reflected in popular names such as Nwakaego; a child is worth more than money or Arawakan; no wealth is worthier than a child, or Nwabuugwu; a child is the greatest honor. In a small part of Igboland (Imo and Abia states- Mba-area), women who successfully deliver ten children are rewarded with special celebrations and rites that honor their hips. Infertility is considered a particularly harsh misfortune. The Igbo believe that it is children who perpetuate the tribe, and in order to do so children are expected to continue Igbo tradition and ways. Parts of Igbo divinities is Agwu, the alusi of health and divination. Agwu is a concept used by the Igbo to explain and understand: good and evil, health and sickness, fortune and misfortune.

Pantheon
 Ala
 Ikenga
 Igwe (Sky Father, also known as Igwekaala in some areas)
 Anyanwu
 Osimmiri, deity of the primordial ocean
 Nne Mmiri/Nmụọ Mmiri, sea goddess who brings wealth, protection, and healing
 Idemmili, river goddess
 Agwu, god of health, divination and medicine
 Ahobinagu, wildlife god
 Ahia Njoku
 Amadioha
 Ekwensu
 Njoku Ji or Ahiajioku, god of agriculture and production 
 Ogbunabali
 Alusi Okija
 Agbala, prophet of the Igbos
 Ibini Ukpabi, Arochukwu god of justice and truth
 Eke, Orie/Oye, Afo, Nkwo, embodiments of the days of the week in the Igbo calendar

See also 
 Igbo mythology
 Orisha
 Loa
 West African Mythology
 Winti
 Yoruba religion
 Nkisi

References 

Igbo religion